Kerið (also Kerith or Kerid) is a volcanic crater lake located in the Grímsnes area in south Iceland, along the Golden Circle. It is one of several crater lakes in the area, known as Iceland's Western Volcanic Zone, which includes the Reykjanes peninsula and the Langjökull Glacier, created as the land moved over a localized hotspot, but it is the one that has the most visually recognizable caldera still intact. The caldera, like the other volcanic rock in the area, is composed of a red (rather than black) volcanic rock. Kerið's caldera is one of the three most recognizable volcanic craters because at approximately 6,500 years old, it is only half the age of most of the surrounding volcanic features. The other two are Seyðishólar and Kerhóll.

While most of the crater is steep-walled with little vegetation, one wall is sloped more gently and blanketed with a deep moss, and can be descended fairly easily. The lake itself is fairly shallow (7–14 metres, depending on rainfall and other factors), but due to minerals from the soil, is an opaque and strikingly vivid aquamarine.

Land owners charge an entrance fee to see the crater of 450 ISK.

Formation
Although volcanologists originally believed Kerið was formed by a huge volcanic explosion, as is the accepted norm with volcanic craters, more thorough studies of the Grímsnes region failed to find any evidence of such an explosion in Kerið. It is now believed that Kerið was a cone volcano which erupted and emptied its magma reserve. Once the magma was depleted, the weight of the cone collapsed into the empty magma chamber. The current pool of water at the bottom of the crater is at the same level as the water table and is not caused by rainfall.

Gallery

References

2. Kerid Crater official site

Volcanoes of Iceland
Volcanic crater lakes
Dormant volcanoes
South Iceland Seismic Zone
Calderas of Iceland